Ipnista is a genus of moths of the family Erebidae. The genus was described by Schaus in 1916.

Species
Ipnista marina H. Druce, 1891
Ipnista tucumana Schaus, 1933

References

Calpinae